Tepe Nautilus, opened in September 2001, is a shopping mall in Turkey. Built by Tepe Group, it is situated in the Acıbadem quarter of Kadıköy district in the Asian part of Istanbul.

Tepe Nautilus is a thematic shopping mall, with its name, decoration and architectural features associated with sea and navigation. The shopping mall consists of 130 stores on three floors, a department store and Carrefour supermarket. The food court hosts 16 restaurants and cafes.

See also
 List of shopping malls in Istanbul

References
 From the Grand Bazaar to the modern shopping centers in Turkey. Turkish Council of Shopping Centers & Retailers (AMPD)

External links
Tepe Nautilus official website
Mobilworx - The on-site shop

Shopping malls in Istanbul
Kadıköy